Sheikh Sarwari are a Muslim community found in the state of Uttar Pradesh in India. While in Pakistan they have settled in Karachi. They are a sub-group within the larger Faqir ethnic group of North India, and are also known as Peerahi, while in Punjab, they are known as Bharai. The Bharai were traditionally priests of the Sultani sect, a syncretic sect with combined elements of Hinduism and Islam. The Sultanis were followers of the Sufi saint Sultan Sakhi Sarwar of Dera Ghazi Khan in what is now Pakistan. Most Sultanis were members of the Hindu Jat community, but the Bharai were always Muslim, and belonged either to the Muslim Jat or Muslim Rajput castes. The Jat Bharai in the central Punjab claim descent from one Garba Jat, a Hindu attendant at the shrine of Sakhi Sarwar, who said to have been instructed by Sakhi Sarwar to convert to Islam in a dream. There are various theories as to the origin of the word Bharai. Horace Rose, the early 20th-century ethnologist of the Punjab made castes such as the Dogar, Habri, Rajput, Gujar, Tarkhan and last, but not least, Jat joining the Bharai brotherhood.

Like other Faqir groups, the Sarwari started off as a Sufi order, the Sarwari Qadiriyya. The word sarvar means ‘leader’, ‘chief’, and ‘master’ in the Persian language, and the Sarwari order was said to be founded by Sultan Bahoo, the famous Sufi of Punjab. Over the time, the Sarwaris have evolved into a distinct caste grouping, bound by the rules of endogamy. They are attendants of sakhi sarwar and thats their occupation.

In terms of distribution, they are concentrated in the western districts of Uttar Pradesh such as Moradabad, Jyotiba Phule Nagar, Bijnor, Rampur and Bareilly. The Sarwari live in multi-caste villages, but occupy their own distinct quarters. They speak both Urdu and the Khari Boli dialect, and are entirely Sunni..

See also
Madari
Qalandar

References

Social groups of Pakistan
Muslim communities of Uttar Pradesh